Goodell is a city in Hancock County, Iowa, United States. The population was 140 at the time of the 2020 census.

History
Goodell was platted in 1884.

Geography
Goodell is located at  (42.923610, -93.614061).

Demographics

2010 census
As of the census of 2010, there were 139 people, 69 households, and 36 families living in the city. The racial makeup of the city was 95.0% White and 5.0% from other races. Hispanic or Latino of any race were 11.5% of the population.

There were 69 households, of which 15.9% had children under the age of 18 living with them, 40.6% were married couples living together, 8.7% had a female householder with no husband present, 2.9% had a male householder with no wife present, and 47.8% were non-families. 34.8% of all households were made up of individuals, and 8.6% had someone living alone who was 65 years of age or older. The average household size was 2.01 and the average family size was 2.42.

The median age in the city was 50.9 years. 11.5% of residents were under the age of 18; 4.3% were between the ages of 18 and 24; 18.8% were from 25 to 44; 46.1% were from 45 to 64; and 19.4% were 65 years of age or older. The gender makeup of the city was 53.2% male and 46.8% female.

2000 census
As of the census of 2000, there were 179 people, 78 households, and 47 families living in the city. The racial makeup of the city was 92.53% White, 6.32% from other races, and 1.15% from two or more races. Hispanic or Latino of any race were 6.32% of the population.

There were 78 households, out of which 28.2% had children under the age of 18 living with them, 50.0% were married couples living together, 6.4% had a female householder with no husband present, and 39.7% were non-families. 35.9% of all households were made up of individuals, and 6.4% had someone living alone who was 65 years of age or older. The average household size was 2.23 and the average family size was 2.94.

In the city, the population was spread out, with 22.4% under the age of 18, 6.9% from 18 to 24, 31.0% from 25 to 44, 28.7% from 45 to 64, and 10.9% who were 65 years of age or older. The median age was 42 years. For every 100 females, there were 109.6 males. For every 100 females age 18 and over, there were 117.7 males.

The median income for a household in the city was $32,292, and the median income for a family was $40,625. Males had a median income of $25,714 versus $27,083 for females. The per capita income for the city was $14,795. About 4.7% of families and 3.0% of the population were below the poverty line, including none of those under the age of eighteen or sixty five or over.

Education
Belmond–Klemme Community School District serves the community. The district formed on July 1, 1994, with the merger of the Belmond and Klemme districts.

References

Cities in Iowa
Cities in Hancock County, Iowa
1884 establishments in Iowa